Clem is both a given name, often a short form (hypocorism) of Clement or other, similar names, a nickname and a surname. Notable people with the name include:

Given name or nickname

In sports
 Clement Clem Calnan (1888–1974), English cricketer
 Clement Clem Clemens (1886–1967), Major League Baseball catcher
 Clem Crowe (1904–1983), American college football and basketball player, college football and basketball head coach and professional football head coach
Clem Curtis (born 1940), Trinidadian-born British singer born Curtis Clements
 Clemon Clem Daniels (born 1937), American college and professional football player
 Clemens Clem Dreisewerd (1916–2001), Major League Baseball pitcher
 Clem Eischen (1926–2020), American middle-distance runner
 Clem Goonan (born 1939), former Australian rules footballer
 Clem Haskins (born 1943), American college and National Basketball Association player and college basketball head coach
 Clemens Clem Hausmann (1919–1972), Major League Baseball pitcher
 Clement Clem Hill (1877–1945), Australian cricketer
 Clement Clem Kennedy (1921–2010), Australian rugby league player
 Clement Clem Labine (1926–2007), American Major League Baseball relief pitcher
 Clement Clem Loughlin (1894–1977), Canadian hockey player
 Charles Clem McCarthy (1882–1962), American sportscaster and public address announcer
 Clem Michael (born 1976), former Australian rules footballer
 Clement Clem Neacy (1898–1968), American National Football League player
 Clem Smith (footballer) (born 1996), Australian rules footballer
 Clement Clem Splatt (1899–1963), Australian rules footballer
 Clement Clem Stephenson (1890–1961), English footballer
 Clement Clem Stralka (1913–1994), American National Football League player
 Richard Clement Clem Thomas (1929–1996), Welsh rugby union footballer
 Clem Turner (1945–2009), American National Football League and Canadian Football League player
 Clement Clem Wilson (1875–1944), English cricketer

In politics and government
 Clement Attlee (1883–1967), British Prime Minister
 Clement Clem Balanoff (born 1953), American politician
 Clement Clem Campbell (born 1948), Australian politician
 Clement Clem S. Clarke (1897-1967), American oilman and politician
 Arthur Clarence Clem Hawke (1898–1989), General Secretary of the Australian Labor Party in South Australia, father of former Prime Minister Bob Hawke
 Clem Jones (1918–2007), Australian politician
 Clem McSpadden (1925–2008), American politician
 Clement V. Rogers (1839–1911), Cherokee senator and judge in Indian Territory
 Clement Clem L. Shaver (1867–?), American politician
 Clement Clem Simich (born 1939), New Zealand politician
 Clem Smith (politician), member of the Missouri House of Representatives since 2011

In arts and entertainment
 Clement Clem Beauchamp (1892–1992), American film actor, producer and director
 Clem Bevans (1879–1963), American character actor
 Clement Clem Burke (born 1955), American rock drummer
 Clemente Clem Cattini (born 1937), English drummer
 Clement Clem Christesen (1911–2003), Australian literary critic
 David Clem Clempson (born 1949), English rock guitarist
 Clement Clem De Rosa (1925–2011), American jazz drummer, composer, arranger, band leader and music educator
 Clem Schouwenaars (1932–1993), Belgian writer
 Clem Seecharan (21st century), Guyanese writer
 Clem Tholet (1948–2004), Rhodesian folk singer

In fiction
 Clem, a fictional character in Warframe
 Clem (Clémentine) Boissier, the main character of the TV series, played by Lucie Lucas
 Clem (Buffy the Vampire Slayer), a character in the television series Buffy the Vampire Slayer
 Clem Kadiddlehopper, a character played by comedian Red Skelton
 A character in the Firesign Theater's I Think We're All Bozos on This Bus album

Other
 Clement Bezold, American political scientist, futurologist
 Clem Coetzee (c. 1939-2006), Zimbabwean conservationist
 Steve "Clem" Grogan (born 1951), American convicted murderer and former member of The Manson Family
 Clements Clem Sohn (1910–1937), American airshow daredevil
 Clement Clem Tisdell (born 1939), Australian economist

Surname
 Brian Clem (born 1972), American politician
 Chester Clem (born 1937), American politician
 George I. Clem (1910–1988), American politician
 Gordon Clem (1909–1970), Australian cricketer
 John Clem (1851–1937), United States Army general
 Mary Clem (1905–1979), American mathematician, and a human computer.
 Mitch Clem (born 1982), American cartoonist

See also
Klem, a surname

Hypocorisms
Lists of people by nickname